is a passenger railway station in the city of Ichihara, Chiba Prefecture, Japan, operated by the East Japan Railway Company (JR East).

Lines
Anegasaki Station is served by the Uchibo Line, and lies 15.1 kilometers from the terminus of the line at Soga Station.

Station layout
The station consists of two island platforms with an elevated station building. The station has a Midori no Madoguchi staffed ticket office. The station has shunts between northbound and southbound tracks which are used during busy periods by trains connected to Tsudanuma and Tokyo which have Anegasaki as their terminus.

Platforms

History
Station was opened on March 28, 1912 as a station on the Japanese Government Railways (JGR) Kisarazu Line. On May 24, 1919, the line's name changed to the Hōjō Line, and on April 15, 1929 to the Bōsō Line and on April 1, 1933 to the Bōsōnishi Line. It became part of the Japan National Railways (JNR) after World War II, and the line was renamed the Uchibō Line from July 15, 1972. The station was absorbed into the JR East network upon the privatization of the Japan National Railways (JNR) on April 1, 1987.

Passenger statistics
In fiscal 2019, the station was used by an average of 10,113 passengers daily (boarding passengers only).

Surroundings
To the east is the Kominato Railway and the Nittō Kōtsū Bus. The Nittō Kōtsū Bus can also be found on the west side operating with eight buses per day on holidays and weekdays. Kominato taxis as well as taxis from other companies can be found on both sides. The Kominato Tetsudō Bus is bound for Aobadai via Teikyo University Ichihara Hospital, while the Nittō Kōtsū Bus runs to various other places. Anegasaki-kōen Soccer Field, the JEF United Ichihara Chiba soccer team practice ground, is a 15-minute walk from the station. Since November 1, 2005 an Aobadai Community Bus running from the east exit to Dia Palace Aobadai via Teikyo University Ichihara Hospital has been in operation.

See also
 List of railway stations in Japan

References

External links

 JR East Station information 

Railway stations in Japan opened in 1912
Uchibō Line
Stations of East Japan Railway Company
Railway stations in Chiba Prefecture
Ichihara, Chiba